The GE C39-8 is a 6-axle diesel-electric locomotive model built by GE Transportation Systems between 1984 and 1987.  It is part of the GE Dash 8 Series of freight locomotives.

A total of 161 examples of this locomotive were built for two North American railroads: Conrail and Norfolk Southern Railway.

The C39-8 was a fairly unpopular locomotive with crews, cited factors such as a rough ride, tendency to overheat, frequent turbocharger issues, issues with the fuel injection system, and various other reliability issues.

Technical 
The C39-8 is powered by a  V16 7FDL-16 diesel engine driving a GE GMC187A2 main alternator.

Like most North American diesel locomotives, the C39-8 uses normal water for cooling.

Original owners

Current use 
Apart from Norfolk Southern's test bed, Pennsylvania Northeastern Railroad's former Norfolk Southern 8212 (née Conrail 6021) is the last C39-8 in active use in North America.

15 Norfolk Southern units were sold to Peru's Ferrocarril Central Andino (FCCA) after RDC acquired a significant part of the company in 1999.

See also
List of GE locomotives

References 

 
 
 
 
 

C39-8
C-C locomotives
Diesel-electric locomotives of the United States
Railway locomotives introduced in 1984
Freight locomotives
Conrail locomotives
Norfolk Southern Railway locomotives
Standard gauge locomotives of the United States
Standard gauge locomotives of Australia
Diesel-electric locomotives of Australia